The 12363 / 64 Kolkata–Haldibari-Kolkata Intercity Express is a Superfast Express train of Indian Railways – Eastern Railway zone that runs between  and  via New Jalpaiguri (Siliguri) & Jalpaiguri in India. 
This is The Longest Running Intercity Express Train In All-Over West Bengal State.

It operates as train number 12363 from Kolkata to Haldibari and as train number 12364 in the reverse direction serving the states of West Bengal.

Introduction
The train started in the year 2005 used to run between Sealdah and New Jalpaiguri with train no 12503/12504 belong to North East Frontier Railway and used to have
only unreserved second-class seating. Latter on this train was extended to Haldibari and originating station was changed from Sealdah to Kolkata Chitpur station. There is 2S and CC seating.

Coaches

12363 / 64 Kolkata–Haldibari Intercity Express presently has 1 AC Chair Car, 9 Second Class Seating(Reserved), 3 General Second Class(Unreserved)  & 2 SLR (Seating cum Luggage Rake) coaches. It does not carry a pantry car.

As is customary with most train services in India, coach composition may be amended at the discretion of Indian Railways depending on demand.

Service

The 12363 Kolkata–Haldibari Intercity Express covers the distance of 620 kilometres in 11 hours 20 mins (54.71 km/hr) & in 11 hours 10 mins as 12364 Haldibari–Kolkata Tri Weekly Intercity Express (55.52 km/hr).

As the average speed of the train is above , as per Indian Railways rules, its fare includes a Superfast surcharge.

Routeing

, 
,  to Haldibari.

Traction

From  to  the train is hauled by WAP-4/WAP-5 / WAP-7 Locomotive of Electric Loco Shed, Howrah.

Timings

12363 Kolkata–Haldibari Intercity Express leaves Kolkata every Tuesday, Thursday & Saturday at 09:05 hrs IST and reaches Haldibari at 20:20 hrs IST the same day.
12364 Haldibari–Kolkata Intercity Express leaves Haldibari every Wednesday, Friday & Sunday at 08:30 hrs IST and reaches Kolkata at 19:40 hrs IST the same day.

Other trains on the Kolkata–New Jalpaiguri sector
 12041/42 New Jalpaiguri–Howrah Shatabdi Express
 22309/40 Howrah–New Jalpaiguri AC Express
 12377/78 Padatik Express
 12344/45 Darjeeling Mail
 15959/60 Kamrup Express
 13175/76 Kanchanjungha Express
 12345/46 Saraighat Express
 15722/23 New Jalpaiguri-Digha Express
 12518/19 Kolkata–Guwahati Garib Rath Express
 12526/27 Dibrugarh–Kolkata Superfast Express
 13141/42 Teesta Torsha Express
 13147/58 Uttar Banga Express
 12503/04 Bangalore Cantonment–Agartala Humsafar Express
 13181/82 Kolkata–Silghat Town Kaziranga Express
 22511/12 Lokmanya Tilak Terminus–Kamakhya Karmabhoomi Express
 12526/27 Dibrugarh–Kolkata Superfast Express
 15644/45 Puri–Kamakhya Weekly Express (via Howrah)
 12509/10 Guwahati–Bengaluru Cantt. Superfast Express
 12507/08 Thiruvananthapuram–Silchar Superfast Express
 12514/15 Guwahati–Secunderabad Express

References

External links

|

Transport in Kolkata
Rail transport in Jharkhand
Rail transport in Bihar
Railway services introduced in 2008
Rail transport in West Bengal
Intercity Express (Indian Railways) trains